Kyle Turner may refer to:
Kyle Turner (rugby league), Australian rugby league footballer for South Sydney
Kyle Turner (footballer), Scottish footballer for Partick Thistle